The Order of the Croatian Interlace or Order of the Early Croatian three-strand pattern is the seventeenth most important medal given by the Republic of Croatia. The order was founded on 1 April 1995. The medal is awarded for advancement of progress and reputation of Croatia and the welfare of its citizens. It is named after the Croatian Interlace, a traditional Croatian ornamental design, an interwoven series of branches used as a wall or barrier.

References 

Orders, decorations, and medals of Croatia
Awards established in 1995
1995 establishments in Croatia